Mahonia napaulensis  is a shrub in the family Berberidaceae described as a species in 1821. It is native to China (Tibet, Yunnan, Sichuan) and the Himalayas (Nepal, Bhutan, Sikkim, Assam, Myanmar). This species is used medicinally throughout the Sikkim Eastern Himalayas.

References

napaulensis
Flora of Asia
Shrubs
Plants described in 1821